"Warmth of Your Eyes" is a song written by American singer-songwriter Billie Hughes. It was recorded by Lazarus on the band's debut eponymous Lazarus album and released as a single in 1972 by Bearsville Records, distributed by Warner Bros. Records Inc.   

The song was produced by Peter Yarrow, of Peter, Paul and Mary, and Phil Ramone.

Billboard, October 23, 1971, gave the eponymous Lazarus album a Special Merit Pick with "Warmth of Your Eyes" cited as one of the best cuts, describing "honesty in the lyrics and optimism in the chords". Bruce Eder of AllMusic described the sound of the band's songs as "acoustic rock with minimal amplification and lots of harmony vocals".

“Warmth of Your Eyes" was a Billboard Recommended Pick, May 6, 1972. Billboard Picks and Plays reported airplay.

Credits and personnel 
Credits are adapted from the album's liner notes.

Lazarus
 Bill Hughes – vocal, guitar
 Carl Keesee – vocal, bass
 Gary Dye – vocal

Production
 Phil Ramone – producer, recording engineer
 Peter Yarrow – producer, musical director

Other versions 
On March 28th, 2011, the song was featured on the folk rock mix album Late Night Tales: Midlake.

References

External links
 
 

1972 singles
Bearsville Records singles
Songs written by Billie Hughes
Billie Hughes songs
Contemporary Christian songs
Warner Music Group singles
Song recordings produced by Phil Ramone
American folk songs